Most visitors to Ecuador can enter the country without a visa. However, some visitors of certain countries must first obtain a visa in advance before being allowed to enter the country. Visitors may stay up to 90 days, except citizens of Peru, who are allowed a maximum stay of 180 days, and citizens of China who are allowed to stay for 90 days per calendar year. All visitors must hold a passport valid for 6 months, except for citizens of Argentina, Bolivia, Brazil, Chile, Colombia, Paraguay, Peru and Uruguay. Citizens of those countries can also enter Ecuador with ID card.

Visa policy map

Visa required countries
Nationals of the following 34 countries require a visa for Ecuador.

1 - A visa is not required if holding an approval code. 
2 - Visa-free policy ended 25 August 2019. Expired passports or other ID documentation accepted. Due to the crisis in Venezuela, the government is offering citizens special visas (including humanitarian and temporary permits) to enter the country.

Galapagos
All visitors to Galápagos Islands must obtain a Transit Control Card at the airport for a fee. Visitors may pre-register for the Transit Control Card online, to save some time, but they will still be required to complete the process at the airport.

Visitor statistics
Most visitors arriving to Ecuador were nationals of the following countries:

See also

Visa requirements for Ecuadorian citizens

References

External links
The official page of the list of countries which need visa to enter Ecuador 
Ministerio de Relaciones Exteriores, Comercio e Integración 
Galapagos registration

Ecuador
Foreign relations of Ecuador